Hausi A. Müller (born August 11, 1955 in Egg, Switzerland) is a Canadian computer scientist and software engineer. He is a professor of computer science at the University of Victoria, British Columbia, Canada and a Fellow of the Canadian Academy of Engineering.

He is known for his work in the fields of software evolution and adaptive systems. He was the lead architect of Rigi, an end-user programmable environment for software analysis, exploration, and visualization.

He was General Chair of the ACM/IEEE International Conference on Software Engineering (ICSE 2001) in Toronto. He serves on the IEEE Computer Society Board of Governors (2015–17) and is Vice President of IEEE Computer Society Technical and Conferences Activities Board. He was Chair of IEEE Computer Society Technical Council on Software Engineering (TCSE) 2010-15. 
Together with Kenny Wong he has provided an efficient implementation of Fortune's algorithm.

Awards and honors
 IEEE Computer Society Golden Core Member, 2016
 Distinguished Service Award, IEEE Computer Society Technical Council on Software Engineering (TCSE), 2016
 Fellow Canadian Academy of Engineering (FCAE), 2012
 Team Award: IBM Canada Project of the Year Award, IBM Center for Advanced Studies (CAS) Markham, Ontario, Canada, 2011
 IBM CAS Research Special Contributions Award, 2010

References

External links
 at the University of Victoria
Citations on Google Scholar
Publications list on DBLP
IEEE Computer Society Learning Webinar on Conferences, 2016

Canadian computer scientists
Living people
1955 births
Rice University alumni
Academic staff of the University of Victoria
Fellows of the Canadian Academy of Engineering